The lateralization of brain function (or hemispheric dominance/ latralisation ) is the tendency for some neural functions or cognitive processes to be specialized to one side of the brain or the other. The median longitudinal fissure separates the human brain into two distinct cerebral hemispheres, connected by the corpus callosum. Although the macrostructure of the two hemispheres appears to be almost identical, different composition of neuronal networks allows for specialized function that is different in each hemisphere.

Lateralization of brain structures is based on general trends expressed in healthy patients; however, there are numerous counterexamples to each generalization. Each human's brain develops differently, leading to unique lateralization in individuals. This is different from specialization, as lateralization refers only to the function of one structure divided between two hemispheres. Specialization is much easier to observe as a trend, since it has a stronger anthropological history.

The best example of an established lateralization is that of Broca's and Wernicke's areas, where both are often found exclusively on the left hemisphere. Function lateralization, such as semantics, intonation, accentuation, and prosody, has since been called into question and largely been found to have a neuronal basis in both hemispheres. Another example is that each hemisphere in the brain tends to represent one side of the body. In the cerebellum, this is the same body side, but in the forebrain this is predominantly the contralateral side.

Lateralized functions

Language
Language functions such as grammar, vocabulary and literal meaning are typically lateralized to the left hemisphere, especially in right-handed individuals. While language production is left-lateralized in up to 90% of right-handers, it is more bilateral, or even right-lateralized, in approximately 50% of left-handers.

Broca's area and Wernicke's area, associated with the production of speech and comprehension of speech, respectively, are located in the left cerebral hemisphere for about 95% of right-handers but about 70% of left-handers. Individuals who speak multiple languages demonstrate separate speech areas for each language.

Sensory processing
The processing of basic sensory information is lateralized by being divided into left and right sides of the body or the space around the body.

In vision, about half the neurons of the optic nerve from each eye cross to project to the opposite hemisphere, and about half do not cross to project to the hemisphere on the same side. This means that the left side of the visual field is processed largely by the visual cortex of the right hemisphere and vice versa for the right side of the visual field.

In hearing, about 90% of the neurons of the auditory nerve from one ear cross to project to the auditory cortex of the opposite hemisphere.

In the sense of touch, most of the neurons from the skin cross to project to the somatosensory cortex of the opposite hemisphere.

Because of this functional division of the left and right sides of the body and of the space that surrounds it, the processing of information in the sensory cortices is essentially identical. That is, the processing of visual and auditory stimuli, spatial manipulation, facial perception, and artistic ability are represented bilaterally. Numerical estimation, comparison and online calculation depend on bilateral parietal regions while exact calculation and fact retrieval are associated with left parietal regions, perhaps due to their ties to linguistic processing.

Value systems
Rather than just being a series of places where different brain modules occur, there are running similarities in the kind of function seen in each side, for instance how right-side impairment of drawing ability making patients draw the parts of the subject matter with wholly incoherent relationships, or where the kind of left-side damage seen in language impairment not damaging the patient's ability to catch the significance of intonation in speech. This has led British psychiatrist Iain McGilchrist to view the two hemispheres as having different value systems, where the left hemisphere tends to reduce complex matters such as ethics to rules and measures, and the right hemisphere is disposed to the holistic and metaphorical.

Clinical significance
Depression is linked with a hyperactive right hemisphere, with evidence of selective involvement in "processing negative emotions, pessimistic thoughts and unconstructive thinking styles", as well as vigilance, arousal and self-reflection, and a relatively hypoactive left hemisphere, "specifically involved in processing pleasurable experiences" and "relatively more involved in decision-making processes". Additionally, "left hemisphere lesions result in an omissive response bias or error pattern whereas right hemisphere lesions result in a commissive response bias or error pattern." The delusional misidentification syndromes, reduplicative paramnesia and Capgras delusion are also often the result of right hemisphere lesions.

Hemisphere damage 
Damage to either the right or left hemisphere, and its resulting deficits provide insight into the function of the damaged area. Left hemisphere damage has many effects on language production and perception. Damage or lesions to the right hemisphere can result in a lack of emotional prosody or intonation when speaking. Right hemisphere damage also has grave effects on understanding discourse. People with damage to the right hemisphere have a reduced ability to generate inferences, comprehend and produce main concepts, and a reduced ability to manage alternative meanings. Furthermore, people with right hemisphere damage often exhibit discourse that is abrupt and perfunctory or verbose and excessive. They can also have pragmatic deficits in situations of turn taking, topic maintenance and shared knowledge.

Lateral brain damage can also affect visual perceptual spatial resolution. People with left hemisphere damage may have impaired perception of high resolution, or detailed, aspects of an image. People with right hemisphere damage may have impaired perception of low resolution, or big picture, aspects of an image.

Plasticity 
If a specific region of the brain, or even an entire hemisphere, is injured or destroyed, its functions can sometimes be assumed by a neighboring region in the same hemisphere or the corresponding region in the other hemisphere, depending upon the area damaged and the patient's age. When injury interferes with pathways from one area to another, alternative (indirect) connections may develop to communicate information with detached areas, despite the inefficiencies.

Broca's aphasia 
Broca's aphasia is a specific type of expressive aphasia and is so named due to the aphasia that results from damage or lesions to the Broca's area of the brain, that exists most commonly in the left inferior frontal hemisphere. Thus, the aphasia that develops from the lack of functioning of the Broca's area is an expressive and non-fluent aphasia. It is called 'non-fluent' due to the issues that arise because Broca's area is critical for language pronunciation and production. The area controls some motor aspects of speech production and articulation of thoughts to words and as such lesions to the area result in specific non-fluent aphasia.

Wernicke's aphasia 
Wernicke's aphasia is the result of damage to the area of the brain that is commonly in the left hemisphere above the Sylvian fissure. Damage to this area causes primarily a deficit in language comprehension. While the ability to speak fluently with normal melodic intonation is spared, the language produced by a person with Wernicke's aphasia is riddled with semantic errors and may sound nonsensical to the listener. Wernicke's aphasia is characterized by phonemic paraphasias, neologism or jargon. Another characteristic of a person with Wernicke's aphasia is that they are unconcerned by the mistakes that they are making.

Society and culture

Misapplication

Terence Hines states that the research on brain lateralization is valid as a research program, though commercial promoters have applied it to promote subjects and products far outside the implications of the research. For example, the implications of the research have no bearing on psychological interventions such as eye movement desensitization and reprocessing (EMDR) and neurolinguistic programming, brain-training equipment, or management training.

Popular psychology 

Some popularizations oversimplify the science about lateralization, by presenting the functional differences between hemispheres as being more absolute than is actually the case. Interestingly, research has shown quite opposite function of brain lateralisation, i.e. left hemisphere creatively and chaotically links between concepts and right hemisphere tends to adhere to specific date and time, although generally adhering to the pattern of left-brain as linguistic interpretation and right brain as spatio-temporal.

Sex differences

In the 19th century and to a lesser extent the 20th, it was thought that each side of the brain was associated with a specific gender: the left corresponding with masculinity and the right with femininity and each half could function independently. The right side of the brain was seen as the inferior and thought to be prominent in women, savages, children, criminals, and the insane. A prime example of this in fictional literature can be seen in Robert Louis Stevenson's Strange Case of Dr. Jekyll and Mr. Hyde.

History

Broca
One of the first indications of brain function lateralization resulted from the research of French physician Pierre Paul Broca, in 1861. His research involved the male patient nicknamed "Tan", who had a speech deficit (aphasia); "tan" was one of the few words he could articulate, hence his nickname. In Tan's autopsy, Broca determined he had a syphilitic lesion in the left cerebral hemisphere. This left frontal lobe brain area (Broca's area) is an important speech production region. The motor aspects of speech production deficits caused by damage to Broca's area are known as expressive aphasia. In clinical assessment of this type of aphasia, patients have difficulty producing speech.

Wernicke
German physician Karl Wernicke continued in the vein of Broca's research by studying language deficits unlike expressive aphasia. Wernicke noted that not every deficit was in speech production; some were linguistic. He found that damage to the left posterior, superior temporal gyrus (Wernicke's area) caused language comprehension deficits rather than speech production deficits, a syndrome known as receptive aphasia.

Imaging
These seminal works on hemispheric specialization were done on patients or postmortem brains, raising questions about the potential impact of pathology on the research findings. New methods permit the in vivo comparison of the hemispheres in healthy subjects. Particularly, magnetic resonance imaging (MRI) and positron emission tomography (PET) are important because of their high spatial resolution and ability to image subcortical brain structures.

Movement and sensation
In the 1940s, neurosurgeon Wilder Penfield and his neurologist colleague Herbert Jasper developed a technique of brain mapping to help reduce side effects caused by surgery to treat epilepsy. They stimulated motor and somatosensory cortices of the brain with small electrical currents to activate discrete brain regions. They found that stimulation of one hemisphere's motor cortex produces muscle contraction on the opposite side of the body. Furthermore, the functional map of the motor and sensory cortices is fairly consistent from person to person; Penfield and Jasper's famous pictures of the motor and sensory homunculi were the result.

Split-brain patients

Research by Michael Gazzaniga and Roger Wolcott Sperry in the 1960s on split-brain patients led to an even greater understanding of functional laterality. Split-brain patients are patients who have undergone corpus callosotomy (usually as a treatment for severe epilepsy), a severing of a large part of the corpus callosum. The corpus callosum connects the two hemispheres of the brain and allows them to communicate. When these connections are cut, the two halves of the brain have a reduced capacity to communicate with each other. This led to many interesting behavioral phenomena that allowed Gazzaniga and Sperry to study the contributions of each hemisphere to various cognitive and perceptual processes. One of their main findings was that the right hemisphere was capable of rudimentary language processing, but often has no lexical or grammatical abilities. Eran Zaidel also studied such patients and found some evidence for the right hemisphere having at least some syntactic ability.

Language is primarily localized in the left hemisphere. While the left hemisphere has proven to be more optimized for language, the right hemisphere has the capacity with emotions, such as sarcasm, that can express prosody in sentences when speaking. According to Sheppard and Hillis, "The right hemisphere is critical for perceiving sarcasm (Davis et al., 2016), integrating context required for understanding metaphor, inference, and humour, as well as recognizing and expressing affective or emotional prosody—changes in pitch, rhythm, rate, and loudness that convey emotions".  One of the experiments carried out by Gazzaniga involved a split-brain male patient sitting in front of a computer screen while having words and images presented on either side of the screen, and the visual stimuli would go to either the right or left visual field, and thus the left or right brain, respectively. It was observed that if the patient was presented with an image to his left visual field (right brain), he would report not seeing anything. If he was able to feel around for certain objects, he could accurately pick out the correct object, despite not having the ability to verbalize what he saw.

Additional images

See also 

 Alien hand syndrome
 Ambidexterity
 Bicameral mentality
 Brain asymmetry
 Chirality
 Contralateral brain
 Cross-dominance
 Divided consciousness
 Dual consciousness
 Emotional lateralization
 Handedness
 Hemispherectomy
 Laterality
 Left brain interpreter
 Parallel computing
 Psychoneuroimmunology
 Right hemisphere brain damage
 Of Two Minds (book)
 Wada test
 Yakovlevian torque

References

External links 
Left Brain, Right Brain? Wrong

Bibliography

Further resources 

 
 
 
 Jill Bolte Taylor (2008). My Stroke of Insight. Viking: USA. 0670020745. 

Neuropsychology
Cerebrum
Brain
Brain asymmetry